Wu Mingzhu (born 3 January 1930) is a Chinese agronomist who is a researcher at the Institute of Horticultural Crops, Xinjiang Academy of Agricultural Sciences. She is an academician of the Chinese Academy of Engineering. She was a delegate to the 13th, 16th and 17th National Congress of the Chinese Communist Party.

Biography
Wu was born in Caidian District of Wuhan, Hubei, on January 3, 1930. She joined the Chinese Communist Party in May 1953. After graduating in August 1953, she was dispatched to the Southwest Bureau of Agriculture and Forestry in Chongqing as a technician. After a short period of working at the Southwest Office of Rural Work Department of CCP Central Committee in Beijing, she was transferred to the Rural Work Department of CCP Ürümqi Committee in December 1955. She successively worked as deputy director and director of Shanshan County Agricultural Technology Station between 1956 and 1961, and deputy director and director of Turpan Agricultural Technology Station between 1962 and 1975, respectively. She was deputy director and than director of Turpan Science and Technology Committee from July 1975 to November 1978. Since 1978, she worked as an official at the CCP Turpan Committee. In January 1985, she resigned from the government and joined the Institute of Horticultural Crops, Xinjiang Academy of Agricultural Sciences as a researcher.

Personal life
Wu married agronomist Yang Qiyou in Shanshan County in the Spring Festival of 1958. He died of gastric cancer in 1985. They have a son named Yang Xia.

Honours and awards
 1995 State Science and Technology Progress Award for breeding and promotion of new muskmelon series in Xinjiang.
 1999 Member of the Chinese Academy of Engineering (CAE)

References

1930 births
Living people
People from Wuhan
Chinese agronomists
Southwest University alumni
Members of the Chinese Academy of Engineering